Acalolepta degener is a species of beetle in the longhorn beetle family.

References

Acalolepta
Beetles described in 1873